Avon is a home rule municipality located in Eagle County, Colorado, United States. The town population was 6,072 at the 2020 United States Census. The town is a part of the Edwards, CO Micropolitan Statistical Area. Avon is the gateway to the Beaver Creek Resort which lies about two miles (3 km) south of the town. It was the previous site of Vail Resorts before the company moved its physical headquarters to Broomfield, Colorado, in 2006. The town is the home of Liberty Skis, an independent ski manufacturing company.

History
The town began as a railway station in 1889. Originally spelled "Avin", the name was later changed to "Avon". 
Avon was incorporated in August 1978.

Geography
Avon is located at  (39.638254, -106.521797), along Interstate 70, U.S. Highway 6, and the Eagle River.

At the 2020 United States Census, the town had a total area of  including  of water. The town rests at 7,430 feet (2265 m) elevation.

One popular destination within Avon is Nottingham Lake, which offers a beach area and paddleboard/pedalboat rentals in the summer.  Next to the lake is the Harry A. Nottingham Park and Pavilion, which serves as the location for an annual art festival, a summer concert series, and other activities.

Demographics

As of the census of 2000, there were 5,561 people, 1,890 households, and 971 families residing in the town. The racial makeup of the town was 72.52% White, 0.79% African American, 0.68% Native American, 0.99% Asian, 0.05% Pacific Islander, 21.79% from other races, and 3.16% from two or more races. Hispanic or Latino of any race were 39.96% of the population.

There were 1,890 households, out of which 27.0% had children under the age of 18 living with them, 39.4% were married couples living together, 5.9% had a female householder with no husband present, and 48.6% were non-families. 21.3% of all households were made up of individuals, and 1.1% had someone living alone who was 65 years of age or older. The average household size was 2.81 and the average family size was 3.23.

In the town, the population was spread out, with 20.6% under the age of 18, 17.5% from 18 to 24, 47.1% from 25 to 44, 13.3% from 45 to 64, and 1.4% who were 65 years of age or older. The median age was 29 years. For every 100 females, there were 141.5 males. For every 100 females age 18 and over, there were 144.0 males.

The median income for a household in the town was $56,921, and the median income for a family was $52,339. Males had a median income of $33,053 versus $30,703 for females. The per capita income for the town was $30,115. About 7.1% of families and 13.9% of the population were below the poverty line, including 13.1% of those under age 18 and none of those age 65 or over.

Neighborhoods
Avon includes a number of neighborhoods including Wildridge, Eagle-Vail, Wildwood, Mountain Star.

Transportation
Town of Avon offers free public transportation comprising four bus routes. ECO Transit provides service within Eagle County, with routes linking Avon with Vail, Minturn, Leadville, Edwards, Eagle, Gypsum and Dotsero. Fares range from $3 to $5 per trip.

Avon does not have an active airport. There had previously been a STOLport (Short Take-Off and Landing) facility in Avon, located between Chapel Place and Traer Creek Plaza. Its outline can be seen on aerial and satellite photography (a road overlays parts of the old runway).

Major highways
 Interstate 70 runs east-west through the middle of Avon. to the east, it connects the town to Vail and Denver. To the west, it connects Avon to Gypsum and Grand Junction, ending at the intersection with Interstate 15, in Utah.
 US 6 begins in Bishop, California, and ends in Provincetown, Massachusetts, serving 12 other states. As in Colorado it runs mostly parallel to Interstates 70 and 76, it can be used as an alternate route from Avon to Edwards, Eagle and Gypsum.

A local four-lane access road spans the Eagle River on a  bridge, constructed in 1992, that was christened "Bob" as the result of a local naming contest. Avon received national attention for the humorous name and made "Bob the Bridge" the theme for several local festivals.

Economy

Top employers
According to Avon's 2020 Comprehensive Annual Financial Report, the top employers in the city are:

Sister cities
 Lech am Arlberg, Austria

See also

Colorado
Bibliography of Colorado
Index of Colorado-related articles
Outline of Colorado
List of counties in Colorado
List of municipalities in Colorado
List of places in Colorado
List of statistical areas in Colorado
Edwards-Glenwood Springs, CO Combined Statistical Area
Edwards, CO Micropolitan Statistical Area
Beaver Creek Resort

References

External links

Town of Avon website
CDOT map of the Town of Avon
Vail Valley Partnership - The Chamber and Tourism Bureau

Towns in Eagle County, Colorado
Towns in Colorado